Get Off is the second album by Miami, Florida, Latin dance/disco group Foxy. The album contains the hit single, "Get Off".

Track listing
"Tena's Song" (Charlie Murciano, Ish Ledesma) — 4:53
"Ready for Love" (Ish Ledesma) — 3:59
"Madamoiselle" (Carl Driggs, Ish Ledesma) — 4:46
"You" (Ish Ledesma) — 6:12
"Get Off" (Carl Driggs, Ish Ledesma) — 5:44
"Lucky Me" (Ish Ledesma) — 6:44
"Goin' Back to You" (Charlie Murciano) — 5:40
"It's Happening" (Carl Driggs, Ish Ledesma) — 3:30

Personnel
Ish Ledesma - backing vocals, guitar, lead vocals, melodica
Richie Puente, Jr. - percussion
Charlie Murciano - backing vocals, keyboards, woodwind
Arnold Paseiro - bass
Joe Galdo - drums, percussion, vocals 
Carl Driggs - backing vocals, lead vocals, percussion
Bonaroo Horns - horns

Chart history

Singles

References

External links
 Foxy-Get Off at Discogs

1978 albums
Soul albums by American artists